ASBM University formerly Asian School of Business Management  was established in 2006 as a private B-School. In the year 2019, the institute was granted the position of a university. It facilitates management education in Odisha. It was founded by Professor Dr. Biswajeet Pattanayak who is known to many for ‘Lagaan’- a movie which looked into IIM classrooms and corporate board rooms. ASBM University courses are mostly in the fields of innovation, business intelligence and leadership skills.

Founder and director 

Prof. Biswajeet Pattanayak is the founder director of ASBM University. He has Ph.D. and D.Litt. in organizational behaviour, D.Sc. in management science and is a Fellow of All India Management Association (AIMA), New Delhi. The institution is headed by Shri Ravindra Chamaria, who is the chairman, and Mr. G. Upadhyaya, who is the associate chairman.

Accreditation and ranking 

ASBM University provides Post Graduate Diploma (PGDM) and undergraduate degree in management  which is duly approved and recognized by AICTE. PGDM has accreditation by National Board of Accreditation (NBA) and the Government of India. The Association of Indian Universities (AIU) recognizes ASBM's PGDM as equivalent to MBA.

ASBM University is a Life member of Association of Management Development Institutions in South Asia (AMDISA). The institution is an Academic member of Retailers Association of India (RAI).

Collaborations 
ASBM University has academic collaborations with:
 California State University, USA
 St. Cloud University, United States
 Universidad Argentina de la Empresa
 North Carolina Central University (USA student exchange, research & internship).

Courses 

BBA (Bachelor's in Business & Administration), recognised by Government of Odisha and affiliated to Utkal University

PGDM (Post Graduate Diploma in Management)

This is a full-time 2 year residential programme. The course is AICTE approved and recognized by the Ministry of HRD and Government of India. The course comprises the core programme in the 1st year and the elective programme in the 2nd year. The course is designed for fresh graduates and candidates with some work experience.

Awards 
 Excellence in Education award – 2013, by the Competition Success Review

References 

	ASBM University.

Universities and colleges in Bhubaneswar
Educational institutions established in 2006
2006 establishments in Orissa